Hazards of Time Travel is a 2018 dystopian, social science fiction novel by Joyce Carol Oates. It tells the story of Adriane Strohl, a 17-year-old living in a dystopian America in 2039.  After her incendiary graduation speech, she is sent back to re-education in the year 1959. Oates began writing it in 2011.

Reception 
The Guardian described Hazards of Time Travel as an "unrelentingly disturbing read", praising the author's ability to write convincingly about "the pervasive misery of living in fear", but also remarking that the book "appears skeletal, super-intelligent, yet somehow depleted. It seems to have been written in an abbreviated rush."

References

Dystopian novels
2018 American novels
2018 science fiction novels
Social science fiction
Novels by Joyce Carol Oates
Ecco Press books
Fiction set in 2039
Fiction set in 1959